Social conservatism is a political philosophy and variety of conservatism which places emphasis on traditional power structures over social pluralism. Social conservatives organize in favor of duty, traditional values and social institutions, such as traditional family structures, gender roles, sexual relations, national patriotism, and religious traditions. Social conservatism is usually skeptical of social change, instead tending to support the status quo concerning social issues. 

Social conservatives also value the rights of religious institutions to participate in the public sphere, thus supporting government-religious endorsement and opposing state atheism, and in some cases opposing secularism.

Social conservatism and other ideological views 
There is overlap between social conservatism and paleoconservatism, in that they both support and value traditional social forms. 

Social conservatism is not to be confused with economically interventionist conservatism, where conservative ideas are combined with Keynesian economics and a welfare state as practised by some European conservatives (e.g. one-nation conservatives in the United Kingdom, Gaullists in France). Some social conservatives support free trade and laissez faire market approaches to economic and fiscal issues, but social conservatives may also support economic intervention where the intervention serves moral or cultural aims. Historian Jon Wiener has described social conservatism as historically the result of an appeal from "elitist preservationists" to lower-class workers to 'protect' wealth from immigration. Many social conservatives support a balance between protectionism and a free market. This concern for material welfare, like advocacy of traditional mores, will often have a basis in religion. Examples include the Christian Social Union of Bavaria, the Family First Party and Katter's Australian Party, and the communitarian movement in the United States.

Social conservatism by country

Canada 

In Canada, social conservatism, though widespread, is not as prominent in the public sphere as in the United States. It is prevalent in all areas of the country but is seen as being more prominent in rural areas. It is also a significant influence on the ideological and political culture of the western provinces of Manitoba, Saskatchewan, Alberta, and British Columbia.

Compared to social conservatism in the United States, social conservatism has not been as influential in Canada. The main reason is that the neoconservative style of politics as promoted by leaders such as former Prime Ministers such as Paul Martin and Stephen Harper have focused on fiscal conservatism, with little or no emphasis on moral or social conservatism. Without a specific, large political party behind them, social conservatives have divided their votes and can be found in all political parties.

Social conservatives often felt that they were being sidelined by officials in the Progressive Conservative Party of Canada and its leadership of so-called "Red Tories" for the last half of the twentieth century and therefore many eventually made their political home with parties such as the Social Credit Party of Canada and the Reform Party of Canada. Despite the Reform Party being dominated by social conservatives, leader Preston Manning, seeking greater national support for the party, was reluctant for the party to wholly embrace socially conservative values. This led to his deposition as leader of the party (now called Canadian Alliance) in favor of social conservative Stockwell Day. The party's successor, the Conservative Party of Canada, despite having a number of socially conservative members and cabinet ministers, has chosen so far not to focus on socially conservative issues in its platform. This was most recently exemplified on two occasions in 2012 when the current Conservative Party of Canada declared they had no intention to repeal same-sex marriage or abortion laws.

Islamic world

Most Muslim countries are somewhat more socially conservative (such as Tajikistan and Malaysia) than neighbouring countries that are not Muslim. However, due to their interpretation of Islamic law also known as Shariah, they have some differences from social conservatism as understood in the nations of West Europe, North America and Oceania.

Arab world 

The Arab world has recently been more conservative in social and moral issues due to the Arab spring.

India

Hindu social conservatism 

Hindu social conservatism in India in the twenty first century has developed into an influential movement. Represented in the political arena by the right-leaning Bharatiya Janata Party. Hindu social conservatism, also known as the Hindutva movement, is spearheaded by the voluntary non-governmental organisation Rashtriya Swayamsevak Sangh. The core philosophy of this ideology is nativism and sees Hinduism as a national identity rather than a religious one. Due to an inclination towards nativism, much of its platform is based on the belief that Islamic and Christian denominations in India are the result of occupations, and therefore these groups should be uprooted from the Indian subcontinent by converting their members back to Hinduism.

In terms of political positions, Hindu social conservatives in India seek to institutionalise a Uniform Civil Code (which is also a directive under Article 44 of the Constitution of India) for members of all religions, over the current scheme of different personal laws for different religions. For instance, polygamy is legal for Muslims in India but not Hindus.

Muslim social conservatism 

There are several socially conservative Muslim organisations in India, ranging from groups such as the Indian Union Muslim League which aim to promote the preservation of Indian Muslim culture as a part of the nation's identity and history.

South Africa 

Social conservatism had an important place in Apartheid South Africa ruled by the National Party.  Pornography, gambling and other activities that were deemed undesirable were severely restricted. The majority of businesses were forbidden from doing business on Sunday.

United States 

Social conservatism in the United States is a right-wing political ideology that opposes social progressivism. It is centered on the preservation of what adherents often call 'traditional' or 'family values', though the accepted aims of the movement often vary amongst the organisations it comprises, making it hard to generalise about ideological preferences. There are, however, a number of general principles to which at least a majority of social conservatives adhere, such as opposition to abortion and opposition to same-sex marriage. Sociologist Harry F. Dahms suggests that Christian doctrinal conservatives (anti-abortion, anti-same-sex marriage) and gun-use conservatives (such as supporters and members of the National Rifle Association of America (NRA)) form two domains of ideology within American social conservatism. 

The Republican Party is the largest United States political party with socially conservative ideals incorporated into its platform. Other socially conservative parties include the American Solidarity Party, the Constitution Party and the Prohibition Party.

Social conservatives are strongest in the South, where they are a mainstream political force with aspirations to translate those ideals using the party platform nationally. Supporters of social conservatism played a major role in the political coalitions of Ronald Reagan and George W. Bush.

Other areas
There are also social conservative movements in many other parts of the world, such as Latin America, Eastern Europe, the Balkans, the Caucasus, Central Europe, Mediterranean countries, Southeast Asia, and Oceania.

List of social conservative political parties

Armenia
Prosperous Armenia

Australia
 Democratic Labour Party
 Katter's Australian Party
 Pauline Hanson's One Nation
 National Party of Australia

Austria
 Freedom Party of Austria
 Austrian People's Party
 Christian Party of Austria

Belgium
 Christen-Democratisch en Vlaams (Christian democrat)
 New-Flemish Alliance (Nationalist)
 Vlaams Belang (Nationalist)

Bosnia and Herzegovina
 Alliance of Independent Social Democrats

Brazil

Current 
 Brazilian Labour Party (PTB)
 Brazilian Labour Renewal Party (PRTB)
 Brazilian Woman's Party (PMB)
 Christian Democracy (DC)
 Liberal Party (PL)
 Patriot (PATRIOTA)
 Republicans (REPUBLICANOS)
 Social Christian Party (PSC)

Defunct 

 Brazilian Integralist Action (AIB) 
 Christian Democratic Party (PDC)
 Democratic Social Party (PDS)
 National Renewal Alliance (ARENA)
 Party of the Reconstruction  of the National Order (PRONA)
 Social Liberal Party (PSL)

Bulgaria 

 GERB
 IMRO – Bulgarian National Movement
 Bulgarian Socialist Party

Chile 
 Christian Social Party (PDC)
 Chilean Republican Party (PLR)
 Independent Democratic Union (UDI)

Czech Republic
Christian and Democratic Union – Czechoslovak People's Party

Denmark
Danish People's Party

El Salvador
Nuevas Ideas
Nationalist Republican Alliance

Estonia
Conservative People's Party
Isamaa

Faroe Islands
 Centre Party

Finland
 True Finns
 Christian Democrats

France
 Movement for France
 National Rally
 The Republicans

Germany
 Alternative for Germany
 Family Party of Germany
 Alliance C – Christians for Germany

Georgia
Alliance of Patriots of Georgia

Greece
 Greek Solution
 Independent Greeks
 New Democracy (Greece)
 Other small parties

Hungary
 Fidesz
 Christian Democratic People's Party
 Our Homeland Movement
 Jobbik

India
 Bharatiya Janata Party
 All India Majlis-e-Ittehadul Muslimeen
 Shiv Sena
 Maharashtra Navnirman Sena
 National People's Party

Indonesia
 Prosperous Justice Party
 Gerindra

Ireland
 Aontú
 Renua Ireland

Israel
 Shas
 Agudat Yisrael
 Degel HaTorah
 The Jewish Home - HaBayit HaYehudi
 National Union - Tkuma
 Noam
 Otzma Yehudit
 New Hope
 Likud

Italy
 The People of Family  (Il Popolo della Famiglia)
 Christian Italy  (Italia Cristiana)
 Union of the Centre

Japan
 Liberal Democratic Party
 Komeito

Latvia
National Alliance
 The Conservatives

Liechtenstein
 Patriotic Union

Lithuania
Order and Justice

Luxembourg
 Alternative Democratic Reform Party
 Déi Konservativ

Malaysia
 United Malays National Organization (UMNO)
 Malaysian United Indigenous Party (BERSATU)
 Homeland Fighters' Party (PEJUANG)

Mexico
Social Encounter Party
National Action Party
Institutional Revolutionary Party

Moldova
Party of Socialists of the Republic of Moldova
Șor Party
Party of Communists of the Republic of Moldova

Netherlands
 Christian Democratic Appeal (CDA)
 Christian Union (CU)
 Political Movement Denk (Denk)
 Reformed Political Party (SGP)

New Zealand
Conservative Party of New Zealand
National Party
New Zealand First

Nigeria
 People's Democratic Party

North Macedonia
 VMRO-DPMNE

Norway
 Christian Democratic Party
 The Christians Party
 Progress Party (Norway)

Pakistan
- Muttahida Majlis-e-Amal Coalition:
 Jamiat Ulema-e-Islam (Fazl)
 Jamaat-e-Islami
 Markazi Jamiat Ahle Hadith
 Tehreek-e-Jafaria
 Jamiat Ulema-e-Pakistan

Philippines
Nationalist People's Coalition

Poland
 Law and Justice
 United Poland
 The Republicans

Portugal
 CDS – People's Party
 Chega
 Social Democratic Party

Romania
 Social Democratic Party
 People's Movement Party
 Alliance for the Union of Romanians
 Democratic Alliance of Hungarians in Romania

Russia
 United Russia
 CPRF
 LDPR
 A Just Russia

Slovakia
 Christian Democratic Movement
 Direction – Slovak Social Democracy
 Slovak National Party
 Ordinary People and Independent Personalities
 We Are Family
 Kotleba – People's Party Our Slovakia
 Republic
 Christian Union

Slovenia
 Slovenian Democratic Party
 New Slovenia

Spain
 Vox
People's Party

Serbia
 Serbian Radical Party
 Dveri
 Healthy Serbia
 Better Serbia
 Democratic Party of Serbia
 People's Freedom Movement
 Serbian Party Oathkeepers
 Serbian Right

South Africa
 African Christian Democratic Party

South Korea
 People Power Party (South Korea)
 Democratic Party of Korea
 Minsaeng Party

Sweden
Alternative for Sweden
Sweden Democrats
Christian Democrats

Switzerland
Swiss People's Party
Federal Democratic Union of Switzerland
Evangelical People's Party of Switzerland
Christian Social Party

Turkey
 Justice and Development Party
 Nationalist Movement Party
 Felicity Party
 Great Unity Party

Ukraine
 European Solidarity
 Batkivshchyna

United Kingdom
 Heritage Party
 UK Independence Party
 Conservative and Unionist Party
 Social Democratic Party (UK, 1990–present)

Scotland
 Scottish Family Party

Northern Ireland
 Democratic Unionist Party
 Traditional Unionist Voice
 Aontú

United States
 Republican Party
 Constitution Party
 Prohibition Party
 American Solidarity Party (social issues)
 Christian Liberty Party
 Alaskan Independence Party

Social conservative factions of political parties
 Christian Democratic Party (The Republicans)
 Blue Labour (Labour Party)
 Cornerstone Group (Conservative Party)
 House Freedom Caucus (Republican Party)
 Republican Study Committee (Republican Party)
 Blue Dog Coalition (Democratic Party)

See also

Christian right
Social inertia: the prevention of social change
Social liberalism
Victorian morality
Paleoconservatism
Traditionalist conservatism
Social conservatism in Canada
Social conservatism in the United States
Anti-abortion movement
Family values

References

Bibliography

Further reading

Carlson, Allan, The Family in America: Searching for Social Harmony in the Industrial Age (2003) 
Carlson, Allan, Family Questions: Reflections on the American Social Crisis (1991) 
Fleming, Thomas, The Politics of Human Nature, (1988) 
Gallagher, Maggie, The Abolition of Marriage: How We Destroy Lasting Love (1996) 
 Himmelfarb, Gertrude, The De-moralization Of Society (1996) 
Hitchens, Peter, The Abolition of Britain. (1999) 
Jones, E. Michael, Degenerate Moderns: Modernity As Rationalized Sexual Misbehavior. (1993) 
Kirk, Russell, The Conservative Mind, 7th Ed. (2001) 
Magnet, Myron, Modern Sex: Liberation and Its Discontents (2001) 
Medved, Diane and Dan Quayle, The American Family: Discovering the Values That Make Us Strong (1997) 
Sobran, Joseph, Single Issues: Essays on the Crucial Social Questions (1983) .

External links

 
Conservatism
Right-wing ideologies
Conservatism
Conservatism
Political science terminology